Irgendwas gegen die Stille is the debut studio album by German singer Wincent Weiss. It was released by Vertigo Berlin on 14 April 2017 in German-speaking Europe.

Track listing

Charts

Weekly charts

Year-end charts

Certifications

Release history

References

2017 debut albums
Wincent Weiss albums